Chabielice-Kolonia  is a village in the administrative district of Gmina Szczerców, within Bełchatów County, Łódź Voivodeship, in central Poland.

The village has an approximate population of 200.

References

Chabielice-Kolonia